Red Granite Pictures was an American film production and distribution company, co-founded by Riza Aziz and Joey McFarland in 2010. Its productions included The Wolf of Wall Street and Dumb and Dumber To. It was dissolved in 2018 after being implicated in the 1Malaysia Development Berhad corruption scandal.

History

Red Granite Pictures made its debut with Friends with Kids, a romantic comedy written and directed by Jennifer Westfeldt. They then executive-produced the thriller Out of the Furnace as well as the 2013 film The Wolf of Wall Street. The latter was directed by Martin Scorsese and stars Leonardo DiCaprio, Margot Robbie and Jonah Hill. The film is based on the memoir of the same name by former stockbroker Jordan Belfort. Red Granite Pictures then produced films such as Dumb and Dumber To and the 2017 film Papillon which was based on the best-selling autobiography by the French convict Henri Charrière. They went defunct in 2018 due to an embezzlement scandal.

Controversies
The producers of the 1994 film Dumb and Dumber claimed Red Granite Pictures pushed them out of producing the 2014 sequel. On July 16, 2014, plaintiffs withdrew their racketeering claim with prejudice, meaning it could not be refiled, which was characterized as a strong suggestion that the lawsuit underlying it had been settled. On July 18, 2014, a request for dismissal was filed in Los Angeles Superior Court and the case was officially settled.  The announcement of the settlement lists the plaintiffs as executive producers, and all claims of racketeering made against Red Granite, Riza Aziz and Joey McFarland were withdrawn.  The plaintiffs said in a statement, “We apologize for naming Riza Aziz and Joey McFarland as individual defendants rather than just Red Granite.”

Red Granite Pictures was caught up in the 1Malaysia Development Berhad scandal. The alleged use of funds stolen from 1MDB is detailed in the book Billion Dollar Whale by Tom Wright and Bradley Hope. In 2016, the FBI issued subpoenas to several past and present employees of the company in regard to allegations that US$155 million was diverted from 1MDB to help finance the 2013 film The Wolf of Wall Street. Red Granite Pictures, which has the ex-Malaysian Prime Minister's stepson, Riza Aziz, as its co-founder and chairman, denied any wrongdoing. However, in March 2018, Red Granite Pictures agreed to pay $60 million to the US government in order to settle a civil lawsuit alleging that its movies were funded in part by money siphoned from 1MDB.

Filmography
As producer

See also
 1Malaysia Development Berhad scandal

References

External links
Official website of Red Granite Pictures
Official website of Red Granite International

Film distributors of the United States
Film production companies of the United States
American companies established in 2010
American companies disestablished in 2018